The Tatuus F3 T-318 is an open-wheel formula race car, designed, developed and built by Italian manufacturer Tatuus, used in various Formula 3 regional categories, as well as the W Series, since 2018.

References

External links
 Tatuus website
 

Open wheel racing cars
Formula Three
Cars introduced in 2018